Highway 10 is a provincial paved undivided highway in the Canadian province of Saskatchewan. It runs from Highway 1 near Balgonie until it transitions into PTH 5 at the Manitoba border. It passes through Fort Qu'Appelle, Balcarres, Melville, and Yorkton. It intersects Highway 1 and Highway 16.

The highway is a component of Canada's National Highway System. Between Highway 1 the intersection with Highway 9 / Highway 16 concurrency in Yorkton, it is designated as a Core Route.

The Melville–Yorkton section of Highway 10 used to go through Willowbrook; in the 1960s Highway 10 was realigned to a more direct route with the bypassed section becoming part of Highway 47 and Highway 52.

Photo gallery

Major intersections 
From west to east:

Highway 10A

Highway 10A is a highway in the Canadian province of Saskatchewan serving the city of Yorkton. It runs from Highway 10 at the city's southwestern limits to Highway 16 / Highway 9 / Highway 10. Like most alternate routes, it was the original configuration for Highway 10 through Yorkton.

At Gladstone Avenue, Highway 16A joins Broadway Street, and the two highways run concurrently to its eastern terminus as Highway 16 / Highway 9 / Highway 10. Highway 10 continues east along Broadway Street.

Major intersections
From west to east.

References

External links 

010
Transport in Yorkton